Gatefold is the third and final album by the American screamo band Orchid. Gatefold marks the band's departure from their early powerviolence-influenced sound in favor of a more traditional screamo/post-hardcore sound. The album was released in 2002 through Ebullition Records.

Track listing

Personnel
Orchid
 Geoff Garlock – bass
 Jayson Green – vocals, percussion, keyboards
 Will Killingsworth – guitars, keyboards, sound collage
 Jeff Salane – drums

Technical personnel
 Alan Douches – mastering
 Will Killingsworth – engineering

Artwork
 Jayson Green – design
 J. Penry – design, color illustration of Angela Davis

References

2002 albums
Ebullition Records albums
Orchid (screamo band) albums